Rowan Taylor is the name of:

Rowan Taylor (composer), American composer
Rowan Taylor (footballer), Montserratian footballer